Kilwa Island is an island on Lake Mweru, Zambia. It was known to Arab and Swahili traders of ivory, copper and slaves, who used the island on the lake as a base at one time. This lake island is 
named after the original Indian ocean island Kilwa Kisiwani in Tanzania.

Islands of Zambia
Lake Mweru
Lake islands of Africa